Wayne Turner may refer to:

 Wayne Turner (basketball)  (born 1976), retired American professional basketball player
 Wayne Turner (kickboxer) (born 1967), British kickboxer
 Wayne Turner (footballer) (born 1961), English former footballer
 Wayne Turner (ice hockey)